Bulgaria competed at the 1952 Summer Olympics in Helsinki, Finland.  The nation returned to the Olympic Games after having missed the 1948 Summer Olympics. 63 competitors, 54 men and 9 women, took part in 34 events in 8 sports.

Medalists

Athletics

Basketball

Preliminary round

Group 2

|}

Quarterfinals
The top two teams in each quarterfinals advanced to the semifinals.  The other two teams in each quarterfinals played in the fifth through eighth place classification.

Quarterfinals group A

|}

Classification matches

5-8th-place match

7th-place match

Boxing

Cycling

Road Competition
Men's Individual Road Race (190.4 km)
Petar Georgiev — 5:24:34.0 (→ 46th place)
Boyan Kotsev — did not finish (→ no ranking)
Ilya Velchev — did not finish (→ no ranking)
Milcho Rosev — did not finish (→ no ranking)

Equestrian

Football

 Preliminary round results

Head coach: Krum Milev

Gymnastics

Shooting

Six shooters represented Bulgaria in 1952.
Men

References

External links
Official Olympic Reports
International Olympic Committee results database

Nations at the 1952 Summer Olympics
1952